Amallectis is a genus of moths belonging to the subfamily Tortricinae of the family Tortricidae.

Species
Amallectis devincta Meyrick, 1917

See also
List of Tortricidae genera

References

 , 2005: World catalogue of insects volume 5 Tortricidae.
 , 1917, Trans. ent. Soc. Lond.nt.nt. 1917: 1
 , 2011: Diagnoses and remarks on genera of Tortricidae, 2: Cochylini (Lepidoptera: Tortricidae). Shilap Revista de Lepidopterologia 39 (156): 397-414.

External links

tortricidae.com

Cochylini
Taxa named by Edward Meyrick
Monotypic moth genera
Tortricidae genera